Incentive Records is an independent dance based company with records, publishing and producer management interests.  It was launched in 1999 with investment from Ministry of Sound and a private investor, and run by XL Recordings/Positiva founder Nick Halkes. Releases by the label include "Liberation" by Matt Darey, "Communication" by Mario Piu, "Angel" by Ralph Fridge, "Boom Selection" by Genius Cru, "Whoomp!...There It Is" by BM Dubs and "Runaway" by Distant Soundz.

Notable artists roster
Chocolate Puma
Distant Soundz
Genius Cru
Mario Più
Matt Darey
Tru Faith & Dub Conspiracy

See also 
 List of record labels
 List of electronic music record labels

References

External links
 Official site

Electronic music record labels
British independent record labels
Record labels established in 1999
English electronic dance music record labels
1999 establishments in the United Kingdom